Afton (also Middledale) is an unincorporated community in the Town of Rock, in Rock County, Wisconsin, United States. The town hall for the Town of Rock is in Afton.

History
Originally called Middletown, the community was renamed in about 1857–8 after the poem Sweet Afton by Robert Burns.

Notable people
 Diane Hendricks, businesswoman, lives in Afton
 Ken Hendricks, businessman, lived in Afton

Notes

Unincorporated communities in Rock County, Wisconsin
Unincorporated communities in Wisconsin
1857 establishments in Wisconsin